2014 IWRF World Championship was the 6th international world wheelchair rugby competition, which took place between August 4 to August 10. The championships was contested between the world's twelve top national teams and was held at the Arena Fyn at Odense Congress Center in Odense, Denmark. The tournament was won by Australia, their first title.

As winners, Australia took the first slot for the wheelchair rugby tournament at the 2016 Summer Paralympics in Rio.

Tournament
Twelve teams contested the 2014 IWRF World Championship. The preliminary rounds consisted of a group stage where the teams were split into two leagues which were contested as a round-robin. This was then followed by a round of crossover matches that  determined the semi-finalists.

Preliminary round

Group A

Group B

Classification rounds

9th–12th places

5th–8th places

Medals round

References

2014
2014 in wheelchair rugby
wheelchair rugby
International rugby union competitions hosted by Denmark